Lukas Müller may refer to:
Lukas Müller (ski jumper), Austrian ski jumper
Lukas Müller (rower), German rower